Look It Up is the debut studio album by Australian country music singer Jasmine Rae. The album was released on 6 September 2008 and debuted and peaked at number 62 on the ARIA Charts.

At the ARIA Music Awards of 2009, the album was nominated for ARIA Award for Best Country Album.

Background and release
Jasmine Rae first caught the attention of the Australian music scene in 2008, when she won the prestigious Telstra Road to Discovery competition.  Shortly after winning the competition, Rae signed a recording deal with ABC Music and was invited to perform at the CMA Music Festival in Nashville USA. Rae released her debut single "Country Singer" which peaked at #1 on the Australian Country Singles and Music Video Charts. Her debut studio album Look It Up was released in September 2008.

Track listing

Charts

Weekly charts

Year-end charts

Release history

References

Jasmine Rae albums
2008 debut albums